This is a list of awards and nominations received by South Korean singer and actress Im Yoon-ah.


Awards and nominations

Other accolades

Listicles

Notes

References

Im Yoon-ah
Im Yoon-ah